Francis Rose MBE (29 September 1921 – 15 July 2006) was an English field botanist and conservationist. He was an author, researcher and teacher. His ecological interests in Britain and Europe included bryophytes, fungi, lichens, higher plants, plant communities and woodlands.

Rose was born in south London. He studied natural sciences at Chelsea Polytechnic and Queen Mary College, University of London, graduating with a degree in botany. He obtained a PhD in 1953, studying the structure and ecology of British lowland bogs.

From 1949, he taught at Bedford College and other colleges in London. In 1964, he joined the geography department as Senior Lecturer in Biogeography at King's College London, becoming a Reader in 1975 until 1981.

He married in 1943 to Pauline and had a family of three sons and a daughter. Rose was awarded the MBE in 2000. He died at Liss in Hampshire.

Books 

 The Wild Flower Key — How to identify wild plants, trees and shrubs in Britain and Ireland, 1981.   Revised by Clare O'Reilly, 2006. Frederick Warne. .
 Colour Identification Guide to the Grasses, Sedges, Rushes and Ferns of the British Isles and North Western Europe, 1989. Viking. .
 The Flora of Hampshire, 1996. Co-authored with Richard Mabey, Lady Anne Brewis and Paul Bowman. Harley Books. .
 Francis Rose and Pat Wolseley 1984 Nettlecombe Park: Its History and Its Epiphytic Lichens - An Attempt at Correlation Co-authored with Pat Wolseley. Academic Journal Offprint from The Journal of the Field Studies Council, Volume 6, No. 1, November 1984. 50 pp, 14 figs 
 The Observer's Book of Wild Flowers, 3rd edition, 1978, Frederick Warne & Co. Ltd  
 Lichens as Pollution Monitors. Co-authored with David L. Hawksworth, 1976. Edward Arnold.  
 The Observer's Book of Grasses Sedges and Rushes, 1974. Frederick Warne & Co. Ltd 

For a full list of publications see Obituary in Watsonia.

References

Further reading 
 Obituary. Francis Rose 1921 - 2006. Watsonia 26: 515 - 518
 Obituary. Francis Rose MBE (1921–2006) Journal of Bryology 29(3):207-210

External links 
 The Francis Rose Reserve, Kew Gardens
 Obituary, The Times, 29 July 2006.
 Obituary, The Independent, 21 July 2006.
 Profile: Francis Rose — Holistic view of ecology and conservation, by John Akeroyd, ''Plant Talk, no. 30, October 2002.

1921 births
2006 deaths
English botanists
English conservationists
English ecologists
English nature writers
Alumni of Queen Mary University of London
Academics of Bedford College, London
Academics of King's College London
Members of the Order of the British Empire
People from Liss